Kermadecia pronyensis is a species of plant in the family Proteaceae. It is endemic to New Caledonia.  It is threatened by habitat loss.

References

pronyensis
Endemic flora of New Caledonia
Taxonomy articles created by Polbot